The Boston Corners station  was a former New York Central Railroad station that served the residents of Ancram, New York.

History
Boston Corners was the first stop of the New York and Harlem Railroad in Columbia County, between Dover Plains (to the south) and the end of the line at Chatham (to the north), and was constructed between 1848 and 1852. The site was originally known as "Boston Corner" which was located at the time in the very Southwest corner of Massachusetts. However, on January 3, 1855 the United States Congress annexed  from Massachusetts to New York. In the early days of the development the area was known as "the Badlands" which was a spot where numerous fugitives would engage in illegal activities such as boxing and prize fights. The railroad was acquired by the New York Central and Hudson River Railroad in 1864, and converted it into the Harlem Division. By the early 1870s the station also began to serve the Poughkeepsie and Eastern Railway and the Rhinebeck and Connecticut Railroad, both of which were eventually acquired by the Central New England Railway. The CNE abandoned the P&E in 1925, and then the R&C in 1938.

Service on the Harlem at Boston Corners was reduced many times in the 20th century, and in 1940 it was reduced to a flag stop. On September 28, 1952 the station was closed by New York Central, remained for a few years and was dismantled a few years later. Passenger service continued until March 20, 1972. Freight continued running on the line until service north of Wassaic ceased on March 27, 1976. The rails were lifted in 1981 by Conrail.

References

External links
Fairbanks Morse C-Liner at Boston Corners; c. 1959, by Chuck Brandt

Railway stations closed in 1972
Former New York Central Railroad stations
Stations along Central New England Railway lines
1972 disestablishments in New York (state)
Former railway stations in New York (state)
Transportation in Columbia County, New York
Railway stations in Columbia County, New York